Weerribben-Wieden National Park (Dutch: Nationaal Park Weerribben-Wieden) is a Dutch national park in the Steenwijkerland and Zwartewaterland municipalities in the Overijssel province. The park was founded in 1992, although De Wieden was added later, in 2009.

History and former use 
Large parts of the area were used for peat production until the Second World War. Since then a part of the area has been used for thatching reed production.

Present management
The area is managed by the large private nature-conservation organisation Natuurmonumenten and by the Staatsbosbeheer (State Forest Service). Other parties are involved in management issues as well, such as local communities. About  is still used for thatching reed production. Villages like the picturesque Giethoorn and monumental towns like Blokzijl and Vollenhove are important for tourism and recreation.

Vegetation and wildlife
The vegetation and wildlife are typical for such an area, full of peat and water. Resident species include the water soldier, the sundew, the black tern, the northern pike and, recently, the otter. In addition, the Green Hawker and the Large Copper are found here.

Visitor centres
 Visitor centre De Weerribben in Ossenzijl
 Information centre of the national park in Kalenberg
 Visitor centre De Wieden in Sint Jansklooster
 Schoonewelle 'Centrum Natuur en Ambacht' in Zwartsluis

Pictures

References

External links

  

Protected areas established in 1992
1992 establishments in the Netherlands
National parks of the Netherlands
Ramsar sites in the Netherlands
Geography of Overijssel
Tourist attractions in Overijssel
Steenwijkerland